Sunair is an airline based in New Zealand.

It operates scheduled services in the North Island. Headquartered in Tauranga, the airline flies to Hamilton, Ardmore, Whangarei, Whitianga, Motiti Island and Great Barrier Island. It also has charter and pilot training operations. Sunair has fifteen aircraft.

History
Sunair initially started as a commuter operator to Motiti Island in the Bay of Plenty with one aircraft. The airline has flown for over 30 years and has a safe accident free record. It operates approximately 4000 flights per year with a staff of 28.

The Civil Aviation Authority of New Zealand withdrew Sunair's Air Operator Certificate, along with the Certificate of Airworthiness for the Sunair fleet, on September 8, 2017. No reason for the certificate withdrawal has been made public by the Authority. The airline remained inoperative while the matter was pursued by the authority.

Sunair remained grounded for 203 days and was finally  granted permission to fly again in April 2018, by NZ CAA.

The first service resumed in its own right was the doctor service between Whangarei and Kaitaia, which Sunair had been able to continue to operate using leased aircraft. Scheduled services were offered again from 28 May 2018 with flights being offered from Hamilton or Tauranga to Great Barrier Island or Whangarei, and from Great Barrier Island to Whitianga or Whangarei. The East Coast service has not been recommenced at this stage.

Destinations
As of August 2021, Sunair currently operates services from the following destinations:

Terminated Destinations
 Auckland - Auckland Airport
 Gisborne - Gisborne Airport
 New Plymouth - New Plymouth Airport
 Napier - Hawke's Bay Airport
 Palmerston North - Palmerston North Airport
 Wairoa - Wairoa Aerodrome
 Paraparaumu - Kapiti Coast Airport
 Kerikeri - Kerikeri Airport
 Wellington - Wellington Airport
 Whakatane - Whakatane Airport
 Rotorua - Rotorua Airport
 North Shore - North Shore Aerodrome

Fleet
As of December 2020, the Sunair fleet consists of the following light aircraft:

 2 Cessna 172
 9 Piper PA-23 Aztec

Former fleet
Over the years Sunair has flown many kinds of airplanes.

Cessna 402
Cessna 206
Piper PA-28 Cherokee
Piper PA-31 Navajo
Partenavia P.68
Cessna 421

References

External links
Sunair website

Airlines of New Zealand
Airlines established in 1985
New Zealand companies established in 1985